Grosvenor Place may refer to:

Grosvenor Place, London
Grosvenor Place (Sydney), Australia
Grosvenor Place, Bath, England